Harradine is a surname. Notable people with the surname include:

Benn Harradine (born 1982), Australian discus thrower
Brian Harradine (1935–2014), Australian politician
Leslie Harradine (1887–1965), English sculptor and potter